Eugénie Cotton (13 October 1881 – 16 June 1967) was a French scientist, socialist, women's rights advocate and was active in the resistance. She was awarded the Stalin Peace Prize in 1951, Knight of the Legion of Honor, and the Gold medal from the World Peace Council in 1961. She died at 85 in Sèvres, near Paris.

Family life 
Cotton was born Eugénie Elise Céline Feytis in Soubise (Charente-Maritime). She enrolled at the École normale supérieure de jeunes filles (ENSJF) in Sèvres in 1901 where she became a pupil of Marie Curie, and met Pierre Curie and Paul Langevin. In 1904, she was first in the female competition of the aggregation of physical and natural sciences. After graduation, she taught at the college in Poitiers and then at the ENSJF. 

In 1913, she married fellow physicist Aimé Cotton (1869 - 1951) who was a professor at the Faculty of Science in Paris and at the École normale supérieure in Saint-Cloud. They had four children (one of whom died shortly after birth).

In 1925, as a doctor of physical sciences, Eugénie Cotton was a research master at the National Center for Scientific Research, the largest French public body of scientific research. She also became director of the ENSJF in 1936. There, she participated in the reform of women's studies, raised the level of science education and developed the on-site laboratory and research.

Wartime activities 
A member of the French Communist Party, she helped the German anti-fascists who had taken refuge in France since 1933, and then she went on to support insurgents fighting fascism in Spain. 

During World War II, the French national Vichy government that supported the German occupation of France mandated that Cotton leave her post at the ENSJF by forced retirement in 1941. In the course of the war, her husband was arrested twice by the Gestapo war but survived the experience.

In 1944, she participated in the founding of the Union of French Women. She was a founding member in 1945 and the first president of the Women's International Democratic Federation. She also served as vice-president of the World Peace Council until her death.

Honors and tributes 

During her lifetime, Cotton received the Stalin Peace Prize, Knight of the Legion of Honor and the Gold medal from the World Peace Council.

After her death, several primary schools in the Paris region were renamed after her, such as in Paris, Sèvres, Champigny-sur-Marne, Nanterre, Vitry-sur-Seine, Bonneuil-sur-Marne, or Rosny-sous-bois. There is also a Eugénie Cotton nursery school in Brétigny-sur-Orge, in Choisy-le-Roi, in Trappes and a school in Brittany, in Lanester, as well as in the Aube in Romilly-sur-Seine and in Moselle at Talange.

Her name was also given to a college of Argenteuil and in Montreuil, a street in the 19th arrondissement of Paris, a street in Saint-Herblain on the outskirts of Nantes, a street in Le Havre, as well as a collective crèche in Morsang-sur-Orge in the department of Essonne.

On Venus, the crater Cotton was named in her honor in 1985.

Archives 
Eugénie Cotton archives are preserved in the collection of feminist literature held at the library called La bibliothèque Marguerite Durand, 79 rue Nationale, in the 13th arrondissement of Paris.

References

Further reading
 
 Loukia Efthymiou, Eugénie Cotton (1881-1967): Stories from a lifetime - Stories from a century, European University Editions, 2019, 459 p.

1881 births
1967 deaths
20th-century French women scientists
French women's rights activists
French socialist feminists
Stalin Peace Prize recipients
French Communist Party members